Josef Strobach (23 December 1852 – 11 May 1905) was an Austrian bookseller and politician, the Mayor of Vienna.

References

1852 births
1905 deaths
People from Děčín District
People from the Kingdom of Bohemia
German Bohemian people
Christian Social Party (Austria) politicians
Members of the Austrian House of Deputies (1901–1907)
Mayors of Vienna
Burials at the Vienna Central Cemetery